Julian Evans is a British adventurer and fund-raiser. Born in Leicestershire, and educated at Oakham School, he is a Fellow of the Royal Institution of Chartered Surveyors, Fellow of The Royal Geographical Society, member of The Explorers Club and Alpine Club. He grew up in Lyddington, Rutland but now lives in Great Easton, Leicestershire.

He is one of about only 100 people in the world to walk to both the North Pole (Magnetic) and South Pole (Geographic) and the 378th Briton to reach the summit of Mount Everest.

He completed the Marathon Des Sables, and cycled from Land's End to John O'Groats. In addition to Everest, he has climbed the highest mountains in several other regions of the world: Mont Blanc (Western Europe), Kilimanjaro (Africa), Mount Elbrus (Europe), Mount Vinson (Antarctica), Denali (North America) and Mount Kosciuszko (Australasia).

Through sponsors, his expeditions have raised donations for several charities, most notably The Matt Hampson Foundation, Myeloma UK, the Progressive Supranuclear Palsy Association and Great Ormond Street Hospital.

References

External links
 Official website 

1977 births
Sportspeople from Rutland
Living people
Fellows of the Explorers Club
People from Great Easton, Leicestershire
Fellows of the Royal Institution of Chartered Surveyors